National Tertiary Route 316, or just Route 316 (or ) is a National Road Route of Costa Rica, located in the San José province.

Description
In San José province the route covers Puriscal canton (San Antonio district), Mora canton (Piedras Negras district).

References

Highways in Costa Rica